Epichorista eribola is a species of moth of the family Tortricidae. It is endemic to New Zealand and has been collected on the Westcoast of the South Island. The adults of this species are on the wing in January and inhabit damp forests.

Taxonomy 
This species was first described by Edward Meyrick in 1889 and named Proselena eribola. In 1911 Meyrick placed this species in the genus Epichorista. In 1928 George Hudson illustrated and discussed this species under that name. The male lectotype specimen, collected at Ōtira River, is held at the Natural History Museum, London.

Description

Distribution 
E. eribola is endemic to New Zealand. It has been collected at its type locality of Ōtira River as well as near Greymouth.

Behaviour 
The adults of this species are on the wing in January.

Habitat 
This species inhabits damp forests up to an altitude of 3000 ft.

References 

Moths described in 1889
Epichorista
Moths of New Zealand
Endemic fauna of New Zealand
Taxa named by Edward Meyrick
Endemic moths of New Zealand